The 1935–36 Serie A season was the 10th season of the Serie A, the top level of ice hockey in Italy. Two teams participated in the league, and HC Diavoli Rossoneri Milano won the championship by defeating Hockey Club Milano in the final.

Final
HC Diavoli Rossoneri Milano - Hockey Club Milano 1:0

External links
 Season on hockeytime.net

1935–36 in Italian ice hockey
Serie A (ice hockey) seasons
Italy